Kumanovo-Kratovo Deanery is part of Diocese of Kumanovo and Osogovo, located in North Macedonia.

Publishing
In Kumanovo-Osogovo diocese are actively publishing, within which is issued The quarterly diocesan "Tavor".

References

Kumanovo
Kratovo, North Macedonia
Macedonian Orthodox dioceses